On-board may refer to:
 On Board (film), a 1998 Turkish film directed by Serdar Akar
 Onboarding, the mechanism through which new employees acquire the necessary knowledge, skills, and behaviors to become effective organizational members and insiders
 On-Board Diagnostics
 On-Board Data Handling